The 2021 F3 Asian Championship was a multi-event, Formula 3 open-wheel single seater motor racing championship. The championship featured a mix of professional and amateur drivers, competing in Formula 3 cars that conform to the FIA Formula 3 regulations for the championship. This was the fourth season of the championship and was won by Guanyu Zhou for Abu Dhabi Racing by Prema.

The season consisted of five consecutive weekends in January and February 2021.

Teams and drivers 

 Manaf Hijjawi was set to compete with Motorscape but did not appear at any rounds due to an injury.
 Alister Yoong was set to compete with BlackArts Racing but only appeared in practice sessions.

Race calendar 
The first proposal for the race calendar was announced on 23 September 2020. To combat possible travel and quarantine regulations because of the COVID-19 pandemic, the season consisted only of races in the United Arab Emirates. This calendar was slightly amended later on. The grid for Race 2 was determined by the fastest laps of Race 1.

Championship standings

Scoring system
Points were awarded to the top ten drivers.

Drivers' Championship

Rookie Cup

Teams Championship
Ahead of each event, the teams nominated two drivers that accumulate teams' points.

References

Notes

External links 

 

Asian F3
F3 Asian
Asian
F3 Asia
F3 Asian Championship